William Horace Wood (5 April 1910 – ?) was an English professional footballer who played as a full back. He began his career with Football League Second Division side Burnley, and was promoted to the senior team at the start of the 1930–31 season. Wood made his competitive debut for the club on 3 January 1931 in the 3–2 win against Southampton at Turf Moor. He went on to make 32 league appearances for Burnley before leaving to join Yeovil Town in May 1934.

Career statistics

References

1910 births
Year of death missing
Footballers from Burnley
English footballers
Association football fullbacks
Burnley F.C. players
Yeovil Town F.C. players
English Football League players